Legénd is a village in Nógrád County, Hungary with 552 inhabitants (2001).

References

Populated places in Nógrád County